Desmond Hoare may refer to:

 Desmond Hoare (admiral) (died 1988), British sailor & educator, pioneer of rigid inflatable boats at Atlantic College
 Des Hoare (born 1934), Australian cricketer